Tony Wallington (born 5 October 1948) is a British bobsledder. He competed at the 1980 Winter Olympics and the 1984 Winter Olympics. He was an army officer being appointed Special Regular Commission as 483385 2nd Lt on 25 January 1974 with seniority dating back to 5 October 1967. He served with the Royal Tank Regiment.

References

1948 births
Living people
British male bobsledders
Olympic bobsledders of Great Britain
Bobsledders at the 1980 Winter Olympics
Bobsledders at the 1984 Winter Olympics
Sportspeople from Northampton